Homecoming in Heaven is an album by American country music artist George Jones. It was released in 1962 on the United Artists record label.

Background
Jones's fondness for gospel music is very well documented.  In the 1989 documentary Same Ole Me, he recalls that he learned how to play the guitar at the church where his mother Clara, a devout woman, played piano.  The church was run by Brother Burl Stephens (with whom Jones would credit as co-writer of several songs on his 1959 gospel album Country Church Time) and Sister Annie, who George remembered "taught me my first chords on the guitar, like C, G, and D and things like that, and I started hangin' out over there more often.  She'd get her guitar and we'd pick and sing together...We used to do all the really old gospel songs."   Jones love of gospel music actually predated his exposure to country music, which he would not hear until his family acquired their first radio.  Jones would continue to record gospel albums throughout his career, including Old Brush Arbors (1965), In a Gospel Way (1974) and The Gospel Collection (2003).

"Someone's Watching Over You" was written by J.P. Richardson (otherwise known as the Big Bopper) who also wrote "White Lightnin'," which was Jones's first number one country hit in 1959. The album is also noteworthy for featuring a Willie Nelson composition called "Kneel At The Feet Of Jesus".  "Wandering Soul" was Jones's only songwriting credit on this album, which he had co-written with Bill Dudley several years before and had recorded previously.

Track listing
"Someone's Watching Over You" (J. P. Richardson) – 2:27
"He Made Me Free" (Darrell Edwards) – 2:39
"Beacon in the Night" (Edwards, Herbie Treece) – 1:52
"Matthew Twenty-Four" (Lonnie Glossom) – 2:18
"Peace in the Valley" (Thomas A. Dorsey) – 2:41
"Wings of a Dove" (Bob Ferguson) – 2:04
"Wandering Soul" (Bill Dudley, George Jones) – 2:28
"He's So Good to Me" (Clyde Beaver) – 2:01
"Magic Valley" (Richardson, Merle Moore) – 2:19
"Kneel at the Feet of Jesus" (Willie Nelson) – 2:03
"Homecoming in Heaven" (Walt Breeland, Paul Buskirk, Claude Gray, Nelson) – 2:31
"My Cup Runneth Over" (Edwards) – 2:42

External links
George Jones' Official Website
Record Label

1962 albums
George Jones albums
Gospel albums by American artists
United Artists Records albums
Albums produced by Pappy Daily